Gondal railway station  is a railway station serving Gondal town, in Rajkot district of Gujarat State of India. It is under Bhavnagar railway division of Western Railway Zone of Indian Railways.

It is located at 140 m above sea level and has three platforms. As of 2016, an electrified double broad gauge railway line exists and at this station, 27 trains stop. Rajkot Airport, is at distance of 39 kilometers.

Major Trains

Following trains halt at Gondal railway station:

 19569/70 Veraval - Rajkot Express
 16333/34 Veraval - Thiruvananthapuram Express
 11087/88 Veraval - Pune Express
 22957/58 Veraval - Ahmedabad Somnath Superfast Express
 11465/66 Somnath - Jabalpur Express (via Bina)
 11463/64 Somnath - Jabalpur Express (via Itarsi)
 19119/20 Ahmedabad - Somnath Intercity Express
 19251/52 Somnath - Okha Express
 12949/50 Porbandar - Santragachi Kavi Guru Superfast Express
 19571/52 Rajkot - Porbandar Express (Via Jetalsar)

References

Railway stations in Rajkot district
Bhavnagar railway division